Lyubov Tkach (Russian: Любовь Ткач; born 18 February 1993) is a Russian athlete competing in the heptathlon. She represented her country at the 2015 World Championships in Beijing finishing 23rd. Earlier that year she won the silver medal at the 2015 European U23 Championships.

Her main personal bests are 6151 points in the heptathlon (Cheboksary 2015) and 4368 points in the indoor pentathlon (Saint Petersburg 2015).

Competition record

Personal bests
Outdoor
200 metres – 24.22 (+1.7 m/s) (Cheboksary 2015)
800 metres – 2:16.35 (Tallinn 2015)
100 metres hurdles – 14.59 (+0.2 m/s) (Cheboksary 2014)
High jump – 1.77 (Cheboksary 2015)
Long jump – 6.08 (+0.5 m/s) (Tallinn 2015)
Shot put – 14.81 (Cheboksary 2015)
Javelin throw – 45.85 (Tallinn 2015)
Heptathlon – 6151 (Cheboksary 2015)
Indoor
800 metres – 2:21.02 (Novocheboksarsk 2014)
60 metres hurdles – 9.01 (Saint Petersburg 2015)
High jump – 1.81 (Saint Petersburg 2015)
Long jump – 5.98 (Saint Petersburg 2015)
Shot put – 14.77 (Saint Petersburg 2015)
Pentathlon – 4368 (Saint Petersburg 2015)

References

Living people
1993 births
Place of birth missing (living people)
Russian heptathletes
World Athletics Championships athletes for Russia
Russian Athletics Championships winners